The Flaghouse Homes were a Baltimore segregated public housing project built in 1955. They were located in the Jonestown section of Southeast Baltimore North of Little Italy and East of downtown bounded by Pratt Street on the South, Baltimore Street on the North, Central Avenue on the East and President Street on the West. They were demolished in 2001.

Trivia
The Flaghouse Homes are shown in Homicide: Life on the Street in episodes 6.1-6.3, the three part sixth season premier titled as "Blood Ties". They are mistakenly called the Perkins Homes, a nearby housing project. This is proven in the following manner: The Flaghouse Homes were North of Little Italy across Pratt Street unlike the Perkins Homes which are east of Little Italy across Central Avenue. Additionally, the Flaghouse Homes were high-rise buildings as depicted on the show unlike the Perkins Homes which are no more than three stories high at any given location.

Buildings and structures demolished in 2001
Jonestown, Baltimore
Public housing in Baltimore
1955 establishments in Maryland
2001 disestablishments in Maryland
Demolished buildings and structures in Baltimore